A familicide is a type of murder or murder-suicide in which one kills multiple close family members in quick succession, most often children, spouses, siblings, or parents. In half the cases, the killer lastly kills themselves in a murder-suicide. If only the parents are killed, the case may also be referred to as a parricide.  Where all members of a family are killed, the crime may be referred to as family annihilation.

Familicide of others
Familicides were used as an enhanced punishment in antiquity. In ancient China, the "nine familial exterminations" was the killing of an entire extended family or clan, usually for treason. Machiavelli advocated the extermination of a previous ruler's family to prevent uprisings in The Prince. Sippenhaft (English: kin liability) was used in Nazi Germany to punish and sometimes execute the relatives of defectors and anyone involved in the 20 July plot. La Cosa Nostra began killing the relatives, including women and more recently children, of informants (pentiti) and rivals in the 1980s. It is not incorporated formally into any modern judicial systems, except in North Korea, where whole-family internment at Kaechon internment camp often ends in death.

Family annihilation

Definition and statistics
Between 1900 and 2000, there were 909 victims of mass murder in the US (defined as four victims within a 24-hour period). Of those, more than half occurred within an immediate family. Although the familicide cases are relatively rare, they are the most common form of mass killings. However, statistical data are difficult to establish due to reporting discrepancies.

Familicide differs from other forms of mass murder in that the murderer kills family members or loved ones rather than anonymous people. This has a different psychodynamic and psychiatric significance, but the distinction is not always made.

A study of 30 cases in Ohio found that most of the killings were motivated by a parent's desire to stop their children's suffering. According to ABC News contributor and former FBI agent Brad Garrett, people responsible for killing their families tend to be white males in their 30s. Many of these crimes occur in August, before school starts, which may delay detection and investigation.

In Australia, a study was done of seven cases of familicide followed by suicide in which marital separation followed by custody and access disputes were identified as an issue.  Some common factors such as marital discord, unhappiness, domestic violence, sexual abuse, threats of harm to self or others were found in varying degrees. It was not clear what could be done in terms of prevention.

Birmingham City University researchers Elizabeth Yardley, David Wilson, and Adam Lynes co-authored "A taxonomy of male British family annihilators, 1980–2013", examining British familicides in the period. Newspaper articles were used as references. The study concluded that most of the perpetrators were male. Men who murder their entire families usually do so because they believe their spouse performed a wrongdoing and that the spouse needs to be punished, they feel that the family members caused a disappointment, they feel that their own financial failings ruined the point of having a family, and because they wish to save their family from a perceived threat. Far fewer women commit familicide, and those who do usually have different reasons, including perceived or imagined loss of custody of children. Male family annihilators are typically driven by loss of control, including financial crises, separation or divorce, and may demonstrate evidence for domestic violence, while for women perpetrators, battery, abuse or mental illness is more common, the act itself more likely premeditated and more likely to include victims under the age of one.

A literature review done in 2018 noted contextual and offense characteristics of familicide. Among the 63 articles reviewed 74–85% noted relationship problems or separation. This article also found evidence of financial problems, intoxication, and use of firearms. This literature review unveiled that 71% of these offenses were motivated in regard to conflict between parents and 29% associated to the perpetrators' situation in life. Lastly this article reported two studies, one of which found that many of the motives involved feelings of abandonment, psychosis, and narcissistic rage. The other study found that 60% of these perpetrators were suicidal and 40% homicidal.

Narrative

Yardley, Wilson, and Lynes divide familicides into four groups: anomic, disappointed, self-righteous, and paranoid.

In this typology, the "anomic" killer sees his family purely as a status symbol; when his economic status collapses, he sees them as surplus to requirements. The "disappointed" killer seeks to punish the family for not living up to his ideals of family life. The "self-righteous" killer destroys the family to exact revenge upon the mother, in an act that he blames on her. Finally, the "paranoid" killer kills their family in what they imagine to be an attempt to protect them from something even worse.

Notable familicides 

 George Forster, December 5, 1802, London, England. Forster allegedly killed his wife and child by drowning them in the Paddington Canal.
 Juhani Aataminpoika, October 18, 1849, Heinola, Finland. Aataminpoika killed his mother, stepfather and their two children, who were his siblings.
 Marty Bergen, January 19, 1900, North Brookfield, Massachusetts. Bergen killed his wife and two children with an axe, then slit his own throat.
 James Reid Baxter, April 8, 1908, Invercargill, New Zealand. Baxter killed his wife and five children, then himself.
 Mateo Banks, April 18, 1922, Azul, Buenos Aires, Argentina. Banks shot dead three siblings, two nieces, one sister-in-law and two family employees.
 Charles Lawson, December 25, 1929, North Carolina. Lawson killed six children and his wife with a 12-gauge shotgun, bludgeoned the bodies to make sure they were dead, and then walked into the woods and shot himself.
 Magda Goebbels and her husband Joseph, May 1, 1945, Berlin, Germany. The Goebbels fatally poisoned their six children before committing suicide together. 
 Troy axe murders, September 28, 1964. William G. Gravlin, a fireman who had recently exited a state hospital after slashing a cousin's wife, murdered Gravlin's wife and his six stepchildren with an axe.
 Charles Whitman, August 1, 1966, Austin, Texas. Whitman killed his wife and mother before committing the University of Texas tower shooting, killing 15 additional people and wounding 31 others. 
 Jeffrey MacDonald, February 17, 1970, Fort Bragg, North Carolina. MacDonald has been convicted of killing his pregnant wife and two preschool-aged daughters.
 John List, November 9, 1971, Westfield, New Jersey. List killed his wife, mother, and three children.
 Ronald DeFeo Jr., November 13, 1974, Amityville, Long Island, New York. DeFeo killed his father, mother, two brothers, and two sisters.
 James Ruppert, March 30, 1975, Hamilton, Ohio. Ruppert killed 11 family members.
 Bradford Bishop, March 1, 1976, Bethesda, Maryland. Bishop allegedly killed his mother, wife, and three sons.
 Simon Nelson, January 7, 1978, Rockford, Illinois. Nelson killed his six children and the family’s dog.
 James Alan Day, October 18, 1984, Evansville, Indiana. Day killed his six children before committing suicide.
 Ronald Gene Simmons, December 22–26, 1987, Dover, Arkansas. Simmons killed 14 family members ranging in age from 20 months to 46 years.
 David Brom murdered his mother, father, younger brother, and sister with an axe in 1988.
 József Istvan Barsi, July 25, 1988, Canoga Park, California. Barsi killed his wife and daughter Judith before committing suicide two days later.
 Ricardo Barreda, November 15, 1992, La Plata, Argentina. Barreda killed his wife, mother-in-law and two daughters.
 Jean-Claude Romand, January 9–10, 1993, Prévessin-Moëns, France. Romand killed his wife, two children, his parents and their dog, and attempted to kill his ex-mistress.
Susan Smith, October 25, 1994, Union, South Carolina. Smith drowned her two sons in a lake and blamed it on an imaginary Black hijacker.
 Freeman family murders, February 26, 1995, Salisbury Township, Lehigh County, Pennsylvania. Two brothers and their cousin murdered the brothers’ parents and younger brother.
 Kip Kinkel, May 20, 1998, Springfield, Oregon. Kinkel killed his parents before committing a school shooting, leaving two additional dead and 25 wounded.
 Vladimir Pokhilko, September 21, 1998, Palo Alto, California. Pokhilko bludgeoned and stabbed his wife and son to death before committing suicide by slitting his own throat.
 1999 Atlanta day trading firm shootings, July 27, 1999, Stockbridge, Georgia. Mark Orrin Barton bludgeoned his wife, son, and daughter to death before going on a shooting rampage at day trading places before killing himself.
 Phillip Austin, July 10, 2000, Northampton, England. Austin murdered his wife, two children, and the family's two dogs.
 Lundy murders, August 29, 2000, Palmerston North, New Zealand. Mark Lundy murdered his wife and daughter.
 Robert William Fisher, April 10, 2001, Scottsdale, Arizona. Fisher has been charged with three counts of first-degree murder of his wife and two children and one count of arson. He is currently a fugitive from justice.
 Dipendra Bir Bikram Shah, June 1, 2001, Kathmandu, Nepal. Dipendra allegedly killed the royal family of Nepal at a family dinner and died from a self-inflicted gunshot to the head.
 Andrea Yates, June 20, 2001, Clear Lake City, Texas. Yates killed her five children, aged between six months and seven years.
 Bluestone family murders, August 28, 2001, Gravesend, Kent, England. PC Karl Bluestone killed his wife and two of their four children before committing suicide.
 Christian Longo, December 18, 2001, Lincoln County, Oregon. Longo killed his wife and three children.
 Marcus Wesson, March 12, 2004, Fresno, California. Wesson killed nine of his children/wives that he fathered through his legal wife and his polygamist wives who were also his daughters and nieces.
 Christopher Porco, November 15, 2004, Delmar, New York.  Porco murdered his father Peter and severely disfigured his mother Joan in an attempt to cover up his financial problems and exploitation of his parents (see Murder of Peter Porco).
 Neil Entwistle, January 20, 2006, Hopkinton, Massachusetts. Entwistle killed his wife and infant daughter.
 Chris Benoit, June 22–24, 2007, Fayetteville, Georgia. Benoit killed his wife and son before later taking his own life.
 Nicholas Waggoner Browning, February 1, 2008, Cockeysvile, Maryland. Nicholas killed his parents and his two younger brothers with a gun.
 Steven Sueppel, March 23, 2008, Iowa City, Iowa. Sueppel killed his wife, their four children, and himself.
 Christopher Foster, August 26, 2008, Maesbrook, Shropshire, England. Foster killed his wife, daughter, horses, and dogs in his luxury home with a rifle before setting the house on fire, dying himself.
 William Parente, April 19–20, 2009, Towson, Maryland. Parente killed his wife, two daughters, and himself.
 Christopher Coleman, May 5, 2009, Columbia, Illinois. Coleman killed his wife Sherri and their sons Garrett and Gavin in the family's home. Coleman was convicted of their murders on May 5, 2011, exactly 2 years after the murders.
 Schenecker double homicide, January 27, 2011, Tampa, Florida. Julie Schenecker murdered her two children while her husband, a U.S. Army officer, was deployed to Iraq.
 Dupont de Ligonnès murders and disappearance, April 2011, Nantes, Loire-Atlantique, France. The wife and four children of Xavier Dupont de Ligonnès were found murdered and buried at the family home. Xavier, the only suspect, disappeared and has never been found.
 Rzeszowski family homicides, August 14, 2011, St Helier, Jersey. Damian Rzeszowski stabbed to death his wife, his two small children, his father-in-law, his neighbor, and the neighbor's child. Sentenced to 30 years in prison, died in custody on 31 March 2018.
 Powell murders, December 6, 2009, West Valley City, Utah, and February 5, 2012, South Hill, Washington. Joshua Powell murdered his sons Charles and Braden by bludgeoning them and setting fire to the house he was renting in February 2012. He is also believed to have murdered his wife Susan in December 2009. Powell committed suicide at the scene after killing his sons.
 Cairns child killings, December 18–19, 2014, Cairns, Australia. Raina Mersane Ina Thaiday (AKA Mersane Warria) was alleged to have drugged and stabbed seven of her children and one of their cousins before attempting to kill herself. She was found not guilty by reason of insanity.
 Van Breda murders, January 27, 2015, Stellenbosch, Western Cape, South Africa. Henri Christo van Breda murdered his parents and brother and severely wounded his sister.
 Broken Arrow killings, July 22, 2015, Broken Arrow, Oklahoma. Brothers Robert and Michael Bever murdered five family members (father, mother and three younger siblings). Two survived the attack, one unharmed. Robert and Michael were each charged with five consecutive counts of first-degree murder.
 Joost family murders, February 2016, Oak Forest, Illinois, David Joost, 54, strangled his wife, Margaret O’Leary Joost, 55, and their son, Daniel, in their beds and subsequently committed suicide. Their daughter was not present for the murders. David was said to be distraught over finances after losing his job. 
 2016 Spalding shooting, July 19, 2016, Lincolnshire, United Kingdom. Lance Hart killed his wife and daughter before killing himself.
 Hart family murders, March 26, 2018, Mendocino County, California. Jennifer and Sarah Hart deliberately drove off a cliff with their six adopted children out of fear that they would be found out as abusive parents.
 Osmington shooting, May 11, 2018, Osmington, Western Australia. Peter Miles murdered his wife, daughter, and his four grandchildren before killing himself.
 Watts family murders, August 13, 2018, Frederick, Colorado. Chris Watts killed his pregnant wife, Shanann, and their two daughters.
 Grant Amato, January 24, 2019, Seminole County, Florida. Amato killed his father, mother and brother. 
 Zaman family homicides, July 28, 2019, Markham, Ontario. Menhaz Zaman killed his mother, father, sister, and grandmother inside their family home.
 Khen family murders, December 14, 2019, Jenks, Oklahoma. Thang Khen gathered his family in the garage, shooting two of his four children before killing himself.
 Todt family murders, December 2019, Celebration, Florida. Anthony Todt confessed to the murders of his wife, 42-year-old Megan, their three children: Alek, age 13; Tyler, age 11; and Zoe, age 4, and the family dog, Breezy.
 Murder of Hannah Clarke, February 19, 2020, Camp Hill, Queensland, Australia. Rowan Baxter set fire to the interior of his wife's car, killing their three children, before killing himself. His wife Hannah would die later that day from her injuries.
 Walton family murders, February 27, 2020, Monroe County, Georgia, Candace Louise Walton set fire to her home murdering her brother, Gerald Walton, 21, and her mother Tasha Vandiver, 46. She pleaded guilty to all counts and was sentence to life with a minimum of 30 years.
 Alex Murdaugh murders, June 7, 2021 Islandton, South Carolina, a 52-year-old man killed his wife and son with a rifle & a shot gun. He was addicted to opioids & stealing from his family’s 4 generation law firm for decades 
 Bascov killings, August 9, 2022, Bascov, Arges County, Romania. Viorel Stan, a 52-year-old mentally ill man, killed five members of his family using stones and a hammer.
 Milligan Ricker murders, September 9, 2022, Elk Mills, Maryland. Marcus Milligan, a 39-year-old violent domestic abuser, murdered four members of his family, his wife, Tara Ricker Milligan, 37, and children, Teresa, 13, Nora , 11, and Finn, 8, before turning the gun on himself.
 Gomez family murders, September 28, 2022, Oak Forest, Illinois. Carlos Gomez, 44, shot his estranged wife, Lupe Gomez, 43, and two of his stepchildren, Briana Rodriguez, 22, and Emilio Rodriguez, 20, outside their home. Carlos then barricaded himself inside their home and set the house on fire before shooting himself in the head.
 Killing of the Haight family, January 4, 2023, Enoch, Utah. Michael Haight, 42, shot and killed his wife, Tausha, 40, five children, Macie, 17, Briley, 12, Ammon, 7, Sienna, 7, Gavin, 4, and mother-in-law, Gail Earl, 78, before killing himself inside their home.
Teo Ghim Heng, a Singaporean property agent who killed his pregnant wife and daughter, and sentenced to death.

Related terms

 Filicide  the killing of a child (or children) by one's own parent (or parents)
 Fratricide  the killing of one’s brother
 Infanticide  the killing of one's child (or children) up to 12 months of age
 Mariticide  the killing of a husband or significant other; current common law term for either spouse of either sex/gender
 Matricide  the killing of one's mother
 Patricide  the killing of one's father
 Sororicide  the killing of one's sister
 Uxoricide  the killing of a wife or significant other

References

Citations

General and cited sources
 Deith, Jane (March 6, 2012). "What drives a man to kill himself and his family?". BBC News.
 "Tragic cases of 'family annihilation' in the UK". Evening Standard. August 24, 2012.
 Pemberton, Max (December 17, 2011). "What drives a father to kill?". The Daily Telegraph.
 Harrison, Louise (August 2, 2010). "Family Annihilation: Debt, Depression and the Fragile Family". Counterfire.

Further reading

External links 
 

 
Family
Homicide
Killings by type
Familicides